Reuma Weizman (Hebrew: ראומה ויצמן ; née Schwartz; born 18 August 1925) is an Israeli public personality and the wife of the seventh President of the State of Israel, Ezer Weizmann, who served in this position from May 13, 1993 to July 13, 2000.

Biography
Reuma Schwartz was born in London, United Kingdom, on August 18, 1925. Her parents, Zvi, born in Novoselytsia, and Rachel, born in Kishinev (daughter of Dov Klimker), were members of the Second Aliyah, founders of the Mapai party and the Faculty of Law at the Hebrew University of Jerusalem. Reuma's older sister was Ruth, who later married Moshe Dayan.

Zvi and Rachel traveled with two-year-old Ruth to England for Zvi's law studies. A year after the birth of Reuma, the family returned to Mandatory Palestine, and settled in Jerusalem in the Rehavia neighborhood. At the age of nine, Reuma moved to Kibbutz Mishmar HaEmek. Her parents, who were preoccupied with the family's livelihood and public activities, decided that kibbutz education would benefit their daughter.

After leaving Mishmar HaEmek, Reuma underwent agricultural training at Kibbutz Nir David and completed a teaching course at the Kibbutzim College in Tel Aviv. When she was looking for a job, Reuma went to a children's home in a suburb of Hamburg that was under the Jewish Agency and the Red Cross, where she worked for about two years with children who were World War II refugees.

After the 1947–1949 Palestine war, Reuma returned to Israel and served in the Women's Corps as a clerk in the Government Press Office.

Reuma met Ezer Weizmann in 1949 when he and Mordechai Hod stopped for her for a ride on the way to a memorial service for Modi Alon. They were married in 1950 in the yard of the home of her sister and husband, Ruth and Moshe Dayan. Moshe Dayan was then the commander of Jerusalem, and the family home was located in Villa Leah in the Rehavia neighborhood of Jerusalem. The couple was married by Chief Rabbi Yitzhak HaLevi Herzog.

In 1951 Ezer Weizmann was accepted to study in the British Air Force and the couple moved to England, where their eldest son Shaul was born. Their daughter Michal was born four years later. Shaul was severely wounded in the canal front during the War of Attrition when an Egyptian sniper shot him on the head. In 1991, Shaul was killed with his wife in a car accident and they were both buried in the cemetery in Or Akiva. In March 1991, a woman sued the Weizmann couple and the estate of their son Shaul, claiming that Shaul was the father of her son. A tissue test that the Weizmann couple underwent proved that the boy is indeed Shaul's son.

Prior to her arrival at the Presidential Residence of Israel, Reuma worked extensively for children with Intellectual disabilities in various social organizations. During her husband's tenure, she opened the President's House to non-profit organizations that organized camps for children with cancer. During the period of the absorption of the large waves of aliyah, she toured the absorption camps sites throughout Israel and cared for the welfare of the immigrants, especially from Ethiopia. Weizmann worked to open the President's House to exhibitions of many Israeli artists, and many of their works were given by the President, with her encouragement, to high-ranking guests outside Israel. She also opened the exhibitions to the general public in order to bring Israeli art closer to the people. Weizmann initiated the "Good Deed Award" which aims to "praise the good deeds of citizens, that were done for the benefit of all, free of charge, in a voluntary framework, which constitutes an example and role model for all of us."

References

External links

Dayan family
English emigrants to Israel
Weizmann family
Spouses of presidents of Israel
Jews in Mandatory Palestine
1925 births
Living people